"Real Thing Shakes" is the twentieth single by B'z, released on May 15, 1996. This song is one of the band's many number one singles in the Oricon chart. This is the only B'z single that was not produced by Matsumoto. It sold over 1,140,000 copies according to Oricon. It was used as the theme song for the drama Oretachi ni Ki o Tsukero..

It was also the band's first officially released English recording.

The song has been cited as one of the band's works that best showcases Inaba's wide vocal range.

It is said that the song was recorded as part of an attempt by BMG Japan to break B'z into the American market that never fully materialized.

Track listing 
Real Thing Shakes

Certifications

References

External links
B'z official website

1996 singles
B'z songs
English-language Japanese songs
Oricon Weekly number-one singles
Japanese television drama theme songs
Songs written by Tak Matsumoto
Songs written by Koshi Inaba
1996 songs